Dam Dama Dam is an Indian television show aired in 1998 on Zee TV. The plot of the show was loosely based on William Shakespeare's Comedy of Errors. The actors Shekhar Suman and Laxmikant Berde played the double roles at the start. Later on, the show was written to include the lead actor's twin sons, there by making Suman and Berde play four roles each.

The show was directed by Arun Frank, who later went on to direct the popular show Zindagi…Teri Meri Kahani.  Suman went on to praise the roles he played on the show.

Plot
Two brothers Sarju (Shekhar Suman) and Birju (Laxmikant Berde) come to the city in the search for work. Their look-alikes Chichi and Chintoo also live in the city. Confusion and antics ensue every time they run into each other's friends and relatives.

Cast
 Shekhar Suman as Chichi/Sarju/Sonu/Karan
 Laxmikant Berde as Chintoo/Birju/Monu/Arjun
 Neelam Sagar
 Jyoti
 Shilpa A. Singh
 Bhavana Balsavar
 Anant Mahadevan
 Dinesh Hingoo
 Shobha Khote
 Dinyar Contractor
 Raju Shrestha as Dance master
 Ashiesh Roy as Various characters

References

Zee TV original programming
1998 Indian television series debuts
Indian comedy television series